Enock Nkulanga is a (born 26 January 1990) is a Ugandan development practitioner whose career spans education, community development, youth leadership development and advocacy. His work was recognized by the former President of the United States, Barack Obama in 2018 as he delivered the Mandela Lecture in Johannesburg, South Africa.

Enock is the founder of LeadMinds Africa, a non-profit organization empowering the next generation of leaders in Africa. His past positions include the Country Director of African Children’s Mission, an international nonprofit with operations in Uganda and Kenya. Enock has also served as the Global Youth Ambassador at TheirWorld advocating and campaigning for children’s rights to  education.

Career & Education 
Enock went to Katuugo SDA located in Nakasongola District, Kakooge Sub-County for his primary education. He then attended Ekitangaala Primary school, where he sat for Primary Leaving Examinations. He later joined Secondary School.

Enock Nkulanga completed his bachelor’s degree in development Studies at Makerere University and has been working in the Non-profit sector/international  development since 2013.

Enock is also a Mandela Institute for Development Studies fellow, who strongly believes that Africa's future is dependent on the quality of emerging young leaders. Enock is one of the emerging young leaders accepted into the African Presidential Leaders Program (APLP) in Egypt. He has been hosted on national television as an outstanding emerging leader and featured in different  publications.

References

1990 births
Children's rights activists
Living people
Makerere University alumni
People from Nakasongola District
People from Central Region, Uganda
Ugandan activists